Walter Darling Fleming "Wattie" Jackson (9 January 1898 – 1951) was a Scottish professional footballer who played as a center forward. He spent five seasons in the Scottish Football League, at least one in the English Football League and two in the American Soccer League.

Born in Glasgow but raised in Renton, West Dunbartonshire from a very early age, Jackson and his younger brother Alex both played professionally. In 1920, Jackson began his career with Kilmarnock of the Scottish Football League. In 1923, while visiting relatives in Detroit, Michigan, he came to the attention Bethlehem Steel who had recently lost center forward Daniel McNiven to the New York Field Club. The team tracked down Jackson in Michigan and offered him $25.00 per week to play for Bethlehem. This was nearly triple his salary in Scotland and on 25 August 1923, signed with the Steelmen, along with his brother.

After one season in the United States, the Jacksons returned to Scotland to join Aberdeen – Alex moved on after one season, but Wattie stayed for a second, although in October 1925 he joined Preston North End in the Football League. In 1927, he returned to the United States where he re-signed with Bethlehem Steel. He played only thirteen games that season before moving to the Philadelphia Centennials of the Eastern Professional Soccer League.

References

External links
 

Scottish footballers
Kilmarnock F.C. players
American Soccer League (1921–1933) players
Bethlehem Steel F.C. (1907–1930) players
Aberdeen F.C. players
Yoker Athletic F.C. players
Preston North End F.C. players
Eastern Professional Soccer League (1928–29) players
Philadelphia Centennials (soccer) players
1898 births
1951 deaths
Date of death missing
Association football forwards
Scottish expatriate sportspeople in the United States
Expatriate soccer players in the United States
Scottish expatriate footballers
Scottish Football League players
Footballers from West Dunbartonshire
Scottish Junior Football Association players
Scottish emigrants to the United States
People from Renton, West Dunbartonshire